Vrbovka is a municipality (village) in southern Slovakia. The nearest town is Veľký Krtíš. First written reference is from 1327.

External links
https://web.archive.org/web/20080111223415/http://www.statistics.sk/mosmis/eng/run.html 

Villages and municipalities in Veľký Krtíš District